Lotion is a skincare product.

Lotion may also refer to:

 Lotion (band), a New York City band
 Lotion (EP), an eponymous album by the band Lotion
 "Lotion", a song by Greenskeepers